Carsina is a genus of moths of the family Erebidae. The genus was erected by George Hampson in 1924.

Species
Carsina bifasciata Wileman, 1914
Carsina enervis Swinhoe, 1890
Carsina flavibrunnea Hampson, 1895
Carsina kanshireiensis Wileman, 1914
Carsina mandarina Leech, 1900
Carsina obliqua Moore, 1867
Carsina undulifera Hampson, 1926

Lepidoptera and Some Other Life Forms gives this name as a synonym of Blasticorhinus Butler, 1893.

References

Calpinae